The following is a list of Singaporean electoral divisions from 1980 to 1984 that served as constituencies that elected Members of Parliament (MPs) to the 5th Parliament of Singapore in the 1980 Singaporean general elections. The number of seats in Parliament had increased by 6 to 75 seats. Since the 1968 Singaporean general election, no opposition candidate had been elected into Parliament under the People's Action Party (PAP) government until the 1981 by-election in Anson.

Constituencies 

Alexandra
Aljunied
Ang Mo Kio
Anson
Ayer Rajah
Bedok
Boon Lay
Boon Teck
Braddell Heights
Brickworks
Bukit Batok
Bukit Ho Swee
Bukit Merah
Bukit Panjang
Bukit Timah
Buona Vista
Cairnhill
Changi
Cheng San
Chong Boon
Chua Chu Kang
Clementi
Delta
Geylang Serai
Geylang West
Havelock
Henderson
Jalan Besar
Jalan Kayu
Joo Chiat
Jurong
Kaki Bukit
Kallang
Kampong Chai Chee
Kampong Glam
Kampong Kembangan
Kampong Ubi
Katong
Kebun Baru
Khe Bong
Kim Keat
Kim Seng
Kolam Ayer
Kreta Ayer
Kuo Chuan
Leng Kee
MacPherson
Marine Parade
Moulmein
Mountbatten
Nee Soon
Pasir Panjang
Paya Lebar
Potong Pasir
Punggol
Queenstown
Radin Mas
River Valley
Rochore
Sembawang
Serangoon Gardens
Siglap
Tampines
Tanah Merah
Tanglin
Tanjong Pagar
Telok Ayer
Telok Blangah
Thomson
Tiong Bahru
Toa Payoh
Ulu Pandan
West Coast
Whampoa
Yio Chu Kang

References

External links 
 

1980